The Goldap district was a Prussian district in East Prussia that existed from 1818 to 1945. Its territory is now divided between the Polish Warmian-Masurian Voivodeship and the Russian Kaliningrad Oblast.

History

Kingdom of Prussia 
On September 1, 1818, the new Goldap district was formed in Regierungsbezirk Gumbinnen from parts of the old Insterburg district. This included the parishes of Dubeningken, Gawaiten, Goldap, Grabowen, Gurnen, Mehlkehmen, Szirgupönen (from 1824) and Szittkehmen. The district office was in Goldap.

On February 1, 1843, a major exchange of territory took place between the district of Goldap and the district of Stallupönen. The parish of Mehlkehmen was transferred from the district of Goldap to the district of Stallupönen, and in return, the parish of Tollmingkehmen was transferred from the district of Stallupönen to the district of Goldap.

Germany 
Since 1871, the district belonged to the German Empire. After the province of Prussia was divided into the provinces of East Prussia and West Prussia, the Goldap district became part of East Prussia on April 1, 1878.

In the spring of 1945 the district was occupied by the Red Army and in the summer of 1945, the Soviet occupation forces placed the southern part of the district including the district town of Goldap under Polish administration and the northern part under Soviet administration, in accordance with the Potsdam Agreement. The German population either fled or were subsequently expelled from the district by the local administrative authorities.

Demographics 
The Goldap district had a majority German population, with significant minorities of Poles and Lithuanians. The vast majority of the population (99.1% in 1849) was Protestant.

Politics

District Administrators 

 1818–1821:Steiner (provisional)
 1821–1835:Gotthold Samuel Abraham Seemann (provisional)
 1835–1855:Gustav Leopold Klein
 1856–1864:Bruno von Schrötter (1816–1888)
 1864–1877:Ludwig Ferdinand Hermann Siehr (1832–1885)
 1877–1880:Bernhard Schopis († 1880)
 1880:von Bornstedt (provisional)
 1880–1884:Heinrich Cranz
 1884–1889:Nikolaus von Werder (1856–1917)
 1889–1902:Ernst Jachmann
 1902–1906:Friedrich von Berg (1866–1939)
 1906–1919:Philipp von Gehren
 1919–1921:Herbert Rohde (1885–1975)
 1921–1932:Hans Berner
 1932–1945:Karl von Buchka (1885–1960)

Elections 
In the German Empire, the district of Goldap, together with the districts of Darkehmen and Stallupönen, formed the constituency Gumbinnen 4.

Municipalities 
After the municipal reform of 1928, the Goldap district comprised the town of Goldap and 171 other municipalities until 1945:

Municipalities dissolved before 1945

Place Names 
From 1936 to 1938, the Nazis implemented extensive renaming of place names in the Goldap district, as in all of East Prussia, as many place names did not seem German enough for them. Some renaming had already taken place before 1936.

Municipality of Sutzken/Hitlershöhe 
On October 27, 1933, the rural community of Sutzken (now known in Polish as Suczki) was renamed Hitlershöhe. This was based on the following application by the municipality dated March 9, 1933:"The village of Sutzken in the Goldap district is a farming village with 167 inhabitants. It is located on the heights south of the town of Goldap. 95% of the residents are National Socialists, while the remaining 5% are German nationalists. There hasn't been a Marxist here for years. [...]."Hitler gave his approval on April 12, 1933 and the new name Hitlershöhe came into effect on October 27, 1933.

References 

Goldap
Gołdap County
1818 establishments in Prussia
States and territories established in 1818
1945 disestablishments in Germany
States and territories disestablished in 1945